Kazemi-ye Yek (also Romanized as Kāz̧emī-ye Yek; also known as Kāz̧emī and Kazemi Ebadi) is a village in Esmailiyeh Rural District, in the Central District of Ahvaz County, Khuzestan Province, Iran. At the 2006 census, its population was 498, in 87 families.

References 

Populated places in Ahvaz County